"Don'cha Go 'Way Mad" is a popular song composed by Illinois Jacquet and Jimmy Mundy, with lyrics written by Al Stillman. It was originally recorded by Illinois Jacquet and His Orchestra as an instrumental on April 6, 1949 as "Black Velvet". Al Stillman later added lyrics and Harry James recorded it as "Don'cha Go 'Way Mad" on December 12, 1949 (released in 1950) on Columbia 38682.

Other notable recordings of "Don'cha Go 'Way Mad"
Rosemary Clooney and The Hi-Lo's - Ring Around Rosie (1957).
Sammy Davis Jr. - Sammy Swings (1957)
Ella Fitzgerald & Sy Oliver - recorded for Decca Records on February 2, 1950 (catalog No. 24917). 
Ella Fitzgerald -  Ella at the Opera House (1958).
Jazz Passengers featuring Deborah Harry and Elvis Costello - Individually Twisted (1996).
Big Kahuna and the Copa Cats - Big Kahuna (1999)
Julie London - Julie (1957).
Lucy Ann Polk - Lucky Lucy Ann (1957).
Frank Sinatra - Sinatra and Swingin' Brass (1962).
Mel Tormé - Mel Tormé, Rob McConnell and the Boss Brass (1986).

Other recordings as "Black Velvet"
Sonny Clark - The Art of The Trio (1958).
Scott Hamilton - for his album After Hours (1997).
Houston Person- for the album Sentimental Journey (2002).

References

Songs with music by Jimmy Mundy
Songs with music by Illinois Jacquet
Songs with lyrics by Al Stillman
1949 songs